Zenda is an unincorporated community in the Town of Linn, Walworth County, Wisconsin, United States. It is located south of Geneva Lake and just north of the Illinois border. Its ZIP code is 53195.

History
In 1955, a meteorite (the Zenda meteorite) was found in Zenda by farmer Allyn Palmer. His oldest son later sold the meteorite to his high school science club for a few dollars.

Amtrak's Lake Country Limited stopped here in 2000–2001.

Economy
The headquarters of Melges Performance Sailboats is located in Zenda.

Notable people
Buddy Melges, Olympic gold medalist in sailing, lives in Zenda.
 Harry Melges III, world champion sailor, and son of Buddy Melges, lives in Zenda.

References

Unincorporated communities in Walworth County, Wisconsin
Unincorporated communities in Wisconsin